Triviella lowtheri is a species of small sea snail, a marine gastropod mollusk in the family Triviidae, the false cowries or trivias.

Description

Distribution

References 

 Cate, C. N. 1979. A review of the Triviidae (Mollusca: Gastropoda). Memoirs of the San 	Diego Society of Natural History 10: 1-126.
 Fehse, D. and W. Massier. 2000. A new Triviella (Gastropoda: Triviidae) from South Africa. La Conchiglia 32 (294-295): 123-126.
 Liltved, W. R. 1989. Cowries and their relatives of Southern Africa. A study of the Southern African Cypraeacean and Velutinacean gastropod fauna. Seacomber Publications, Cape Town, South Africa: 208 pp., 298 figs.
 Rosenberg, G. and C. C. Finley. 2001. New species of Triviidae (Mollusca: Gastropoda) from South Africa, Namibia and the Philippines. Proceedings of the Academy of 	Natural Sciences of Philadelphia 151: 23-30.
 Beals M.N. (2008) A new species of Triviella (Gastropoda: Triviidae) from South Africa. Visaya 2(3): 29-32

External links 

Triviidae
Gastropods described in 2008